Andrew B. Peitzman is an American surgeon currently the Distinguished Professor of Surgery and Mark M. Ravitch Chair in Surgery at University of Pittsburgh.

References

Year of birth missing (living people)
Living people
University of Pittsburgh faculty
American surgeons
University of Pittsburgh alumni